Inside Edge may refer to:

 Inside Edge (TV series), an Indian-American web television series
 INside Edge, a website and business publication run by Gerry Dick
 Inside Edge (magazine), a gambling magazine launched by Dennis Publishing before Poker Player
 Inside edge (cricket)